The 2014 Ottawa Gee-Gees football team represents the University of Ottawa in the 2014 CIS football season. They are led by second-year head coach Jamie Barresi and play their home games at Gee-Gees Field. They are a member of the Ontario University Athletics conference. They began their season on September 1, where they defeated the York Lions 51-7 at home. Their regular season ended on October 25 with a 38-18 home win against the #3 McMaster Marauders. They gained the 5th seed in the OUA playoffs and where they traveled to Windsor to play the Lancers on November 1 coming away with a 46-29 win. They advanced to take on McMaster in the OUA semifinals, where after holding a lead over the team that would eventually go on to lose in the Vanier Cup, their season came to an end with a 42-31 loss.

Personnel

Coaching staff

Schedule

Schedule Source:

Game summaries

York

The Gee-Gees opened their 2014 campaign with a resounding 51-7 win over the York Lions. Junior quarterback Derek Wendel completed 24 of 26 passes for 341 yards and four touchdown passes. Junior running back Mack Tommy led a Gee-Gees rushing attack that racked up 267 yards, 105 of those yards and a TD coming from Tommy.

The game would become the Gee-Gees largest margin of victory in the 2014 regular season.

@ Queen's

The #16 Gee-Gees would go on the road to take on the 2013 Yates Cup finalist #9 Queen's Gaels. The first quarter was all Gee-Gees as they took the ball 91 yards down the field on 5 plays to open the scoring on a 31-yard Vincent Campbell TD catch. They'd add another seven minutes later on an 11-yard Mack Tommy run. Queen's would come alive in the second quarter. On the quarter's opening play, Gaels' quarterback Billy McPhee threw a TD get Queen's on the board. With 5:39 to go in the half, Queen's took their first lead, 17-14, with a touchdown pass to Jonah Pataki.

In the fourth quarter the Gee-Gees would put up 21 points to steal a comeback win and hand Queen's their first loss at Richardson Stadium in three years. QB Derek Wendel finished 35 for 52 passing, tallying 401 yards through the air, and three TD passes while also leading the team in rushing with 104 yards on the ground.

Following the win, the Gee-Gees would move to become the #8 team in the nation.

Guelph

@ Carleton

@ Toronto

Waterloo

@ Windsor

McMaster

OUA Playoff Quarterfinal @ Windsor

OUA Playoff Semifinal @ McMaster

Awards and honours
 J. P. Metras Trophy
Ettore Lattanzio

Honours

OUA All-Stars
First Team
Ettore Lattanzio
Second Team
Adam Valchuk
Nick Lecour
All-Rookie Team
Jackson Bennett

All-Canadians
Ettore Lattanzio

References

2014 in Canadian football
Ottawa Gee-Gees football seasons
Ottawa Gee-Gees football